Molenaar is a Dutch surname deriving from the Dutch word for "miller".

Molenaar is the surname of:

Beau Molenaar (born 1985), a Dutch football goalkeeper
Cees Molenaar (1928–1979), founder of the football club AZ
Dee Molenaar (1918–2020), an American mountaineer, author and artist
Frans Molenaar (1940–2015), a Dutch fashion designer
Hillie Molenaar (born 1945), a Dutch documentary film director
Jan Molenaar (1958–2009), perpetrator of the Napier shootings in New Zealand
Keje Molenaar (born 1958), a Dutch footballer
Klaas Molenaar (1921–1996), founder of the football club AZ
Marjolijn Molenaar (born 1983), a Dutch cricketer
Peter Molenaar (born 1946), Dutch psychologist
Robert Molenaar (born 1969), a Dutch footballer
Tim Molenaar (born 1981), a New Zealand rugby player
Willem Molenaar (born 1945), a Dutch cricket umpire

Moolenaar is the surname of:

Bram Moolenaar (born 1961), a Dutch computer programmer
John Moolenaar (born 1961), an American politician from Michigan

See also 
Mulder
Smulders

Dutch-language surnames
Occupational surnames